Love Bebop (stylized as LOVE BEBOP) is the twelfth studio album by Japanese singer Misia. It was released on January 6, 2016, through Ariola Japan. The title, which is synonymous with love freestyle, was inspired by the evolving LGBT movement in Japan, leading Misia to draw a parallel between the growing societal recognition for all forms of love and the various messages of love depicted on the album. On the album's eponymous title track, Misia quotes former American president Barack Obama, who declared "love is love" in a speech given in the aftermath of the Supreme Court of the United States's landmark decision to legalize same-sex marriage nationwide. The album yielded five singles, "Shiroi Kisetsu" / "Sakura Hitohira", "Orphans no Namida" and the digital exclusive double A-side single "Nagareboshi" / "Anata ni Smile :)".

Background and release
Misia began working on her next material immediately following the release of her eleventh studio album New Morning, and the conclusion of the Hoshizora no Live VII: 15th Celebration concert tour, in March 2014. She scheduled studio sessions with Shirō Sagisu, whom she had not collaborated with since Soul Quest (2011). The writing and recording process wrapped in October 2015, with Misia holding her final sessions with Sakoshin, another producer she had missed. The pair last worked together on "Catch the Rainbow" (2008). For Love Bebop, she collaborated once again with DJ Gomi, Takayuki Hattori, Hiroshi Matsui and Tohru Shigemi, and brought along new collaborators, including the songwriters her0ism, Ki-Yo, Andreas Öberg, Rica and Shirose, from the band White Jam. The album was primarily recorded in Japan but also internationally, including in London, Dallas and Atlanta.

Love Bebop was released almost two years after her last studio album, New Morning (2014). The first pressing of the record came housed in a digipak and included various album-related stickers and a bonus remix. The album was reissued in limited numbers of 1,000 copies on the eve of Misia's thirty-eighth birthday, July 6, 2016, in 12-inch vinyl format. The analog edition includes three additional remixes, of which two were previously unreleased.

Critical reception
CDJournal praised Misia's voice on the record as "expressive", and stated that her "knock-down" vocal performance "left no stone unturned". Writing for Bounce, Koji Dejima gave Love Bebop a warm review, describing himself as "pleasantly surprised" by the "rhythmic" uptempo tracks on the album, especially in the wake of Misia's performance of "Orphans no Namida" at the 66th NHK Kōhaku Uta Gassen, which Dejima describes as "in line with the image of the powerful diva". He noted the presence of early collaborators of Misia and praised their "lively and emotive" contributions. Dejima remarked that the "exciting charm" of Misia makes Love Bebop an "album to lose yourself in".

Commercial performance
Love Bebop entered the daily Oricon Albums Chart at number 4, where it also peaked. It debuted at number 5 on the weekly Oricon Albums Chart, with sales of 14,000 copies, making it Misia's first studio album since "Just Ballade" (2009) to debut in the top five. The album debuted on the Billboard Japan Hot Albums chart at number 7 and at number 8 on the Top Albums Sales chart. Love Bebop charted for twelve non-consecutive weeks on the Oricon Albums Chart, selling a reported total of 27,000 copies during its run.

Track listing

Credits and personnel
Credits adapted from the liner notes of Love Bebop.

Locations
Recorded at Orange Peel Recordings, Atlanta; Luminous Sound Studio, Dallas; Abbey Road Studios, London; Eastcote Studios, London; MSR Studios, New York; Germano Studios, New York; Gomi's Lair Recording Studio, New York; Bass Hit Studio, New York; Beethoven Studio, Paris; Rhythmedia Studio, Tokyo; Sony Music Studios Tokyo, Tokyo; Sound Inn, Tokyo
Mixed at Rhythmedia Studio, Tokyo; Mirrorball Entertainment Studios, Los Angeles; Bass Hit Studio, New York;
Mastered at Powers Mastering Studio, New York
Personnel

 Lead vocals – Misia
 Backing vocals – Misia, Lorrain Briscoe, Evette Briscoe, Paul Lee, Lyn, Hanah Spring, Sakoshin, Yuho Yoshioka
 Production – DJ Gomi, Takayuki Hattori, her0ism, Hiroshi Matsui, Shirō Sagisu, Sakoshin, Tohru Shigemi
 Programming – DJ Gomi, her0ism, Hiroshi Matsui, Alex Niceforo, Shirō Sagisu, Sakoshin
 Additional instrumentation – DJ Gomi, her0ism, Hiroshi Matsui, Alex Niceforo, Sakoshin
 Piano – Sae Konno, Yasuharu Nakanishi
 Acoustic piano – Yasuharu Nakanishi
 Electronic keyboard – Chris Rob, Tohru Shigemi
 Rhodes – Yasuharu Nakanishi, Mark Walker
 Hammond organ – Mark Walker
 Guitar – Errol Cooney, Koichi Korenaga, Taichi Nakamura, Andrew Smith, Shuhei Yamaguchi, Satoshi Yoshida
 Acoustic guitar – Takayuki Hijikata, Taichi Nakamura
 Electric guitar – Andrew Smith
 Drums – Gary Husband, Lil John Roberts
 Percussions – Karlos Edwards
 Suspended cymbal – Marie Oishi
 Celesta – Sae Konno
 Harp – Skaila Kanga
 English horn – Akiko Mori
 Flugelhorn – Steve Sidwell
 Horns arrangement – Shirō Sagisu, Steve Sidwell
 Trumpet – David Guy, Steve Sidwell
 Saxophone – Ian Hendrickson
 Tenor sax – Dave Bishop, Jamie Talbot
 Baritone sax – Dave Bishop

 Alto sax – Jamie Talbot
 Flute – Jamie Talbot
 Cello – Shinichi Eguchi, Masami Horisawa, Tomoki Iwanaga, Martin Loveday, Jun Nakamura, Takayoshi Okuizumi, Takahiro Yuki
 Bass – Nathan Watts
 Contrabass – Koji Akaike, Shigeki Ippon, Atsushi Kuramochi, Chris Laurence, Yoshinobu Takeshita
 Strings – Koichiro Muroya Strings
 Orchestra – London Studio Orchestra
 Conducting – Takayuki Hattori, Nick Ingman
 Orchestra arrangement – Shirō Sagisu
 Violin – Akane Irie, Naoko Ishibashi, Kyoko Ishigame, Aya Ito, Shizuka Kawaguchi, Perry Montague-Mason, Koichiro Muroya, Aya Notomi, Machi Okabe, Shoko Oki, Natsumi Okimasu, Emlyn Singleton, Toshihiro Takai, Shiori Takeda, Rina Tanaka, Tomomi Tokunaga, Risa Yamamoto, Yuya Yanagihara, Hanako Uesato, Emiko Ujikawa
 Viola – Mikiyo Kikuchi, Peter Lale, Yuya Minorikawa, Saori Oka, Gentaro Sakaguchi, Tomoko Shimaoka, Masaki Shono
 Choir – United Voices
 Choir arrangement – Myron Butler
 Engineering – Jonathan Allen, Raheem Amlani, Philip Bagenal, DJ Gomi, Roy Hendrickson, Masahiro Kawaguchi, Shirō Sagisu, Sakoshin, Kenta Yonesaka
 Mixing – Dave Darlington, Masahiro Kawaguchi, Tony Maserati
 Mastering – Herb Powers Jr.
 Design – Hiroki Kato
 Musician coordinator – Noriko Sekiya
 Art direction – Mitsuo Shindō
 Photography – Kazunali Tajima
 Executive producer – Hiroto Tanigawa

Charts

Sales

Release history

References

External links
 

2016 albums
Misia albums
Ariola Japan albums
Albums produced by DJ Gomi
Albums produced by her0ism
Albums produced by Shirō Sagisu